Mojtaba or Mujtaba is an Iranian male given name. It originates from the Arabic language, meaning the chosen. The name has an Islamic background and is considerably popular among the Shiites and Sufis as it is one of the honorary epithets of Hasan ibn Ali, the 2nd Imam of Shia Islam.

People named Mojtaba

 Mojtaba Abedini (born 1984), Iranian Olympic fencer
Mojtaba Haghdoust (born 1996), Iranian football player for Foolad F.C.
Mojtaba Heidarpanah (born 1990), Iranian cartoonist and illustrator
Mojtaba Jabbari (born 1983), retired Iranian football player for Esteghlal F.C.
Mojtaba Khamenei (born 1969), Iranian hard-line cleric and a son of Ali Khamenei
Mojtaba Minovi (1903–1977), Iranian historian, literary scholar and professor of Tehran University
Mojtaba Mirtahmasb (born 1971), Iranian filmmaker and producer
Mojtaba Mirzadeh (1946–2005), Iranian composer of Persian classical music
Mojtaba Moharrami (born 1965), former Iranian football player
Mojtaba Ramezani (born 1989), Iranian football midfielder
Mojtaba Saminejad (born 1980), Iranian blogger and political activist
Mojtaba Zonnour (born 1963), Iranian Shia cleric
Mujtaba al-Shirazi, Iranian Shia Cleric
Seyed Mojtaba Hosseini, Iranian Shia Cleric
Mujtaba Musavi Lari, Iranian Shia Cleric
Mojtaba Tehrani, Iranian Shia Cleric

Arabic masculine given names
Iranian masculine given names